Statistics of the Scottish Football League in season 1936–37.

Scottish League Division One

Scottish League Division Two

 
Scottish Football League seasons